Growing Up and Other Lies is a 2015 American comedy film written and directed by Darren Grodsky and Danny Jacobs and starring Adam Brody, Wyatt Cenac, Jacobs, Josh Lawson and Amber Tamblyn.

After being in New York City for years, first as a student, later as a struggling artist, Jake has decided to give up and return home to Ohio. He convinces his three oldest friends (and former roommates) to help him have their greatest adventure together on his last day in the city: a walk down the 260 blocks of Manhattan.

Revisiting spots in an attempt to relive the glory of their youth doesn't go quite as planned. Over the course of the day, old conflicts resurface, Jake hunts down his ex-girlfriend and each of them face their own crises of manhood.

Cast
Adam Brody as Rocks
Wyatt Cenac as Gunderson
Danny Jacobs as Billy
Josh Lawson as Jake
Amber Tamblyn as Tabatha
Lauren Miller as Emma

Release
The film was released in theaters and via video-on-demand on March 20, 2015.

Reception
The film has an 8% rating on Rotten Tomatoes.  S. Jhoanna Robledo of Common Sense Media awarded the film two stars out of five.  Anthony Salveggi of Paste gave it a rating of 5.8.  Mike D'Angelo of The A.V. Club graded the film a C.

Justin Lowe of The Hollywood Reporter gave the film a negative review and wrote "Intermittently amusing but rarely as funny as it wants to be, this low-budget indie will find its best fit on digital platforms."

References

External links
 
 

American comedy films
2015 comedy films
2010s English-language films
2010s American films